San Nicola a Nilo is a Baroque-style Roman Catholic church on Via San Biagio dei Librai #10, in the center of Naples, province of Campania, Italy. It stands across from the Palazzo Diomede Carafa.

History
After Masaniello's revolution of 1647, the pharmacist Sabato Anella took pity on the many children orphaned in the upheavals, and created an orphanage at his home near Sedile di Porto. Thereafter the  Count of Oñate, then Viceroy, obtained a building at this site from the Marquis of Mari. A church and adjacent oratory-church were built, and supervised by a monastic order. The church was dedicated to dedicated to St Nicolas, Bishop of Myra, patron of orphans and grocers.

The children boarded there had to live by a monastic rule. Over time, the house was transformed into a monastery open to youngsters from wealthy families. In 1705, the church we see now was built using a design by Giuseppe Lucchesi. After the Irpinia earthquake of 1980, the complex was abandoned and given to the Community of Sant'Egidio. The church has a central Greek cross plan with a circular room, decorated in baroque style with Corinthian columns.

References

18th-century Roman Catholic church buildings in Italy
Former churches in Naples
Baroque architecture in Naples
Orphanages in Italy